The 2015–16 season is Southern Districtn RSA's 14th competitive season and the first season in the Hong Kong Premier League, the top-tier division in Hong Kong football, since 2014. Southern will compete in the Premier League, Senior Challenge Shield and FA Cup in this season.

Key events
 5 May 2015: Former head coach Fung Hoi Man confirmed his departure at the end of 2014–15 season.
 8 May 2015: The club appointed former Kitchee assistant coach Cheng Siu Chung as their head coach.
 2 June 2015: Hong Kong goalkeeper Tse Tak Him joins the club from Sun Pegasus for free.
 3 June 2015: Hong Konbg defender Sham Kwok Fai joins the club from Sun Pegasus for free. On the other hand, Spanish free agent striker Jonathan Carril re-joins the club.
 6 June 2015: Brazilian defender Tomas Maronesi joins the club from Wong Tai Sin on a free transfer.
 10 June 2015: Hong Kong midfielder Leung Tsz Chun joins the club from Eastern for an undisclosed fee.
 12 June 2015: Hong Kong striker James Stephen Gee Ha joins the club from Biu Chun Rangers for an undisclosed fee.
 20 June 2015: Hong Kong defender Shay Spitz joins the club from Biu Chun Rangers on a free transfer.
 20 June 2015: The club extended contracts with three players, including Lam Ho Kwan, Lo Wai Tat, Kwok Ting Him.
 24 June 2015: The club extended contract with goalkeeper Wong Tsz Him.
 25 June 2015: Brazilian winger Wellingsson de Souza joins the club from I-Sky Yuen Long on a free transfer.
 5 July 2015: Spanish defender Diego Garrido Garcia joins the club from La Roda CF on a free transfer.
 11 July 2015: Hong Kong midfielder Luk Chi Ho Michael joins the club from Eastern for an undisclosed fee.
 13 July 2015: Spanish midfielder José María Díaz Muñoz re-joins the club from YFCMD on a free transfer.
 13 July 2015: Hong Kong midfielder Emmet Wan, Ho Chuck Hang and defender Wang Hecun join the club on loan from Kitchee until the end of the season.
 15 July 2015: Hong Kong defender Chan Cham Hei joins the club from Lung Moon on a free transfer.
 1 August 2015: Hong Kong defender Chan Kong Pan joins the club from Sun Pegasus on a free transfer.
 22 September 2015: Hong Kong defender Leung Robson Augusto Ka Hai joins the club from Kitchee on loan until the end of the season.

Players

Squad information

Last update: 1 August 2015
Source: Southern District RSA
Ordered by squad number.
LPLocal player; FPForeign player; NRNon-registered player

Transfers

In

Summer

Out

Summer

Loan in

Summer

Loan out

Summer

Club

Coaching staff

Squad statistics

Overall stats
{|class="wikitable" style="text-align: center;"
|-
!width="100"|
!width="60"|League
!width="60"|Senior Shield
!width="60"|FA Cup
!width="60"|Total Stats
|-
|align=left|Games played    ||  0  ||  0  ||  0  || 0
|-
|align=left|Games won       ||  0  ||  0  ||  0  || 0
|-
|align=left|Games drawn     ||  0  ||  0  ||  0  || 0
|-
|align=left|Games lost      ||  0  ||  0  ||  0  || 0
|-
|align=left|Goals for       ||  0  ||  0  ||  0  || 0
|-
|align=left|Goals against   ||  0  ||  0  ||  0  || 0
|- =
|align=left|Players used    ||  0  ||  0  ||  0  || 0
|-
|align=left|Yellow cards    ||  0  ||  0  ||  0  || 0
|-
|align=left|Red cards       ||  0  ||  0  ||  0  || 0
|-

Squad stats

Top scorers

The list is sorted by shirt number when total goals are equal.

Disciplinary record
Includes all competitive matches.Players listed below made at least one appearance for Southern first squad during the season.

Substitution record
Includes all competitive matches.

Last updated: 1 August 2015

Captains

Competitions

Overall

First Division League

Classification

Results summary

Matches

Pre-season friendlies

References

Southern District RSA seasons
Hong Kong football clubs 2015–16 season